Sunday Drive is a 1986 American made-for-television family comedy film produced by Walt Disney Television starring Tony Randall, Carrie Fisher, Audra Lindley and Ted Wass. It originally aired November 30, 1986 as a presentation of The Disney Sunday Movie on ABC.

Plot
Two drivers with identical cars unwittingly take each other's vehicle while at a restaurant – one belonging to a childless couple, Bill and Joan, out on a Sunday drive with their niece and nephew (Christine and John) while their parents are away – and the other car belonging to Paul Sheridan, a young man on his way to meet his fiancé and to begin working for her father.

In Paul's car is his dog, whom Bill and Joan mistake for the children when they get into his car and drive away; and while Paul goes into their car, the children are under a blanket and he mistakenly assumes it's his dog. But when each driver eventually discovers their mistake, everyone has a hassle trying to get back together.

Cast
Tony Randall as Uncle Bill
Carrie Fisher as Franny Jessup
Audra Lindley as Aunt Joan
Ted Wass as Paul Sheridan
Hillary Wolf as Christine Franklin
Raffi Di Blasio as John Elliot Franklin
Claudia Cron as Susan
Norman Alden as Norman

References

External links

1986 television films
1986 films
1986 American television episodes
1980s comedy road movies
ABC network original films
American comedy road movies
Disney television films
Walt Disney anthology television series episodes
Films scored by Brad Fiedel
1980s American films